The Rocky Mountain Rangers is a Primary Reserve infantry regiment of the Canadian Army. The regimental headquarters are located at JR Vicars Armoury in Kamloops, British Columbia. The Rocky Mountain Rangers are part of the 3rd Canadian Division's 39 Canadian Brigade Group.

Lineage

The Rocky Mountain Rangers 
Originated 1 April 1908 in Nelson, British Columbia, as the 102nd Regiment
Redesignated 1 June 1909 as  the 102nd Regiment, Rocky Mountain Rangers
Redesignated 12 March 1920 as The Rocky Mountain Rangers
Redesignated 1 January 1941 as the 2nd (Reserve) Battalion, The Rocky Mountain Rangers
Redesignated 28 January 1946 as The Rocky Mountain Rangers'

There is no lineal connection to the Rocky Mountain Rangers of the North-West Rebellion of 1885.

Lineage Chart of the Rocky Mountain Rangers: 

|- 
|style="text-align: left;"|
 class="wikitable"
+ Abbreviations used in the chart
-
! Abbreviation !! Phrase
-
 Bn  Battalion
-
 CASF  Canadian Active Service Force
-
 CEF  Canadian Expeditionary Force
-
 Coys  Companies
-
 Infy  Infantry
-
 Regt  Regiment

Perpetuations

Great War
172nd Battalion (Rocky Mountain Rangers), CEF

Operational history

Great War
The 102nd Regiment, Rocky Mountain Rangers, was called-out on active service on 6 August 1914 for local protection duties.

The 172nd Battalion (Rocky Mountain Rangers), CEF, was authorized on 15 July 1916 and embarked for Great Britain on 25 October 1916. There, its personnel were absorbed by the 24th Reserve Battalion, CEF on 1 January 1917 to provide reinforcements for the Canadian Corps in the field. The battalion disbanded on 17 July 1917.

After the militia reorganization of 1936, and in the years prior to the Second World War, the regiment had four companies: A Company in Kamloops, B Company in Salmon Arm, C Company in Armstrong, and D Company in Revelstoke.

Second World War
The regiment was called out on service on 26 August 1939. Details of the regiment were subsequently placed on active service on 1 September 1939, as The Rocky Mountain Rangers, CASF (Details), for local protection duties. The details called out on active service were disbanded on 31 December 1940.

The regiment subsequently mobilized the 1st Battalion, The Rocky Mountain Rangers, CASF for active service on 1 January 1941.  
It served in Canada in a home defence role as part of the 18th Infantry Brigade, 6th Canadian Division and took part in the expedition to Kiska, Alaska as part of the 13th Canadian Infantry Brigade Group, serving there from 16 August 1943 to 12 January 1944.

It embarked for Great Britain on 25 May 1944. It was redesignated as the 1st Canadian Infantry Training Battalion, Type A (Rocky Mountain Rangers), CASF on 1 November 1944. Following VE-Day it was redesignated as the No. 9 Canadian Repatriation Depot, Type "T"' on 5 July 1945. The overseas battalion disbanded on 28 January 1946.

Afghanistan
The regiment contributed an aggregate of more than 20% of its authorized strength to the various Task Forces which served in Afghanistan between 2002 and 2014.

History

Early history 
On July 1, 1898, five independent rifle companies were formed in the interior of British Columbia at Kamloops, Nelson, Kaslo, Rossland, and Revelstoke. These units were named by their location (Kamloops Rifle Company etc.) The independent companies were renamed the Rocky Mountain Rangers in 1900 but remained independent companies. No regimental headquarters was established at this time.  The same year saw nineteen men from the unit depart to fight in the Second Boer War.

On April 1, 1908, an additional company was formed in Nelson, this unit with the three southern companies were amalgamated to form the 102nd Regiment with headquarters in Nelson.  An independent company was formed in Armstrong. The Rocky Mountain Rangers were reduced to two companies in Kamloops and Revelstoke. In 1909 these two remaining companies were amalgamated with the others to form the 102nd Regiment Rocky Mountain Rangers.  In 1912 a reorganization of the regiment saw the companies in Rossland, Nelson, Kaslo and Revelstoke disbanded, the headquarters relocated to Kamloops and the Armstrong company amalgamated. Later that year, the Revelstoke company was reinstated and more companies added at Kelowna, Salmon Arm, Vernon and Penticton.

First World War 
With the advent of the First World War, the 102nd Regiment Rocky Mountain Rangers was placed on active service for local protection duties. In 1916 the unit raised the 172nd Battalion Canadian Expeditionary Force for overseas deployment. On arrival overseas the battalion was dispersed to augment other Canadian infantry units. Although the men did not fight as Rocky Mountain Rangers, the regiment was awarded battle honours by virtue of their contribution in the battles of Arras, 1917, Hill 70, Ypres 1917, Amiens, Hindenburg Line and Valenciennes.  Princess Patricia of Connaught presented a set of unofficial colours to the 172nd battalion in 1916. The Battle Honours were emblazoned on the colours after the war.

The 102nd Regiment continued to serve in a reserve capacity for much of the war. One of its tasking was to staff internment camps at Revelstoke, Mara Lake and Vernon.  The 102nd also provided substantial numbers to the 54th (Kootenay) Battalion of the CEF.  In 1917 the 172nd Battalion was reduced to nil and disbanded to be perpetuated by The Rocky Mountain Rangers.  In 1920 the regiment renamed The Rocky Mountain Rangers and reorganized to four companies. The unit organization remained basically the same until the start of the Second World War.

Second World War 
In August 1939 the regiment was called out for local defence duties, to guard vulnerable points along the CPR/CNR railways. This task was taken over by the Royal Canadian Mounted Police by early 1940 as the regiment was down to almost nil strength due to reinforcement drafts to other active units.

In June 1940 the regiment, re-designated The Rocky Mountain Rangers CASF, was ordered to mobilise to full wartime strength.  The active service 1st Battalion was employed on west-coast defence duties in various communities in the Vancouver area, Prince Rupert and on Vancouver Island. During one notable deployment, the battalion marched from Kamloops to Vancouver as a training exercise under simulated war conditions. The 500 km march took 14 days with temperatures reaching 40 degrees Celsius.  This march was re-enacted by the unit's serving members in 1998.

The situation developing in the Pacific presented a real and immediate threat to the Pacific coast and the BC interior. To meet this threat the reserve unit, now re-designated the 2nd Battalion, was assigned to the 39 (Reserve) Brigade Group and tasked to provide protection of vulnerable industrial points along the CPR railroad lines in the interior and to recruit and train as part of a brigade group in defence of the west coast. With its headquarters remaining in Kamloops, the battalion was spread along the main and southern CPR rail lines from Ashcroft in the west to Fernie in the east.

Kiska 

In 1943 the 1st Battalion, then part of the 13th Canadian Infantry Brigade, sailed from Vancouver Island to the American base on the island of Adak in the Aleutian Island chain where the battalion underwent specialized training for the assault on the Japanese-occupied island of Kiska. The Rocky Mountain Rangers formed the core of the 16th Canadian Combat Team for the assault on Kiska. The force sailed from Adak on 13 August for a scheduled assault on Kiska two days later.  As it was, the Japanese had abandoned the island several days before under the cover of fog and darkness, leaving a cannon which was later brought back to Vernon Military Camp. The Rangers remained on the island until the middle of January 1944, unfortunately losing an officer and several men to booby traps and friendly fire. This operation is commemorated every year with the unit's Christmas dinner being designated as Kiska dinner.

1944–1945 
Later that year the 1st Battalion sailed to Europe as part of the 13th Infantry Brigade. Upon arrival in England the Rangers were welcomed and hosted by the British infantry regiment The Green Howards (Alexandra, Princess of Wales Own Yorkshire Regiment), the beginning of a close relationship which continues today. The two regiments were officially designated allied regiments in 1948. As in the First World War the 1st Battalion was broken up to augment other under strength Canadian units. Once again over 5000 Rocky Mountain Rangers fought overseas with other Canadian units.

Post-war 
In 1946 the unit was reverted to reserve status with HQ in Kamloops and companies in Kamloops, Prince George, Salmon Arm, Armstrong and Revelstoke. In 1952 the company in Revelstoke was relocated to Whitehorse. This company became inactive three years later.  In 1959 the Armstrong company headquarters was relocated to Revelstoke. This organization remained until 1970 when the companies in Prince George and Salmon Arm were reduced to nil strength.   In 1978 the company in Revelstoke was relocated to Salmon Arm.  In 1998 the company in Salmon Arm was reduced to nil strength and relocated on paper to Kamloops.

The original Regimental Colour presented to the regiment by Princess Patricia in 1916, though never consecrated, now hang in St Paul's Cathedral in Kamloops. In 1983 Prince Philip, Duke of Edinburgh, presented the first official consecrated colours to the regiment in a ceremony at Kamloops. A replacement Regimental Colours was presented in 1998 following the official reversion to green facings used by the rifle regiments in place of the blue facing used by line infantry regiments.

The Freedom of the City of Kamloops was presented to the regiment in 1982, Salmon Arm in 1992, and Prince George in 2018.

Recent activities
In 2008 the unit saw the deployment of 12 of its soldiers to Afghanistan, and has since deployed troops in further support of the Canadian effort in Afghanistan. 2008 also marked the unit's 100th anniversary, making it one of the first reserve units in British Columbia to do so. In addition to Afghanistan related deployments, Rocky Mountain Rangers also provided support to the 2010 Winter Olympics.

In February 2011, 39 Canadian Brigade Group announced that the Rocky Mountain Rangers would be standing up a detachment of company strength in the community of Prince George, forty years after the unit there had been reduced to nil strength. The Rocky Mountain Rangers continue successful recruiting efforts in the community, having reached platoon size, "B" Company is approaching company size. 2016 saw an average of 60 soldiers parading out of Prince George, up from the expected 30 or so in 2013.

Alliances 
  - The Yorkshire Regiment (14th/15th, 19th and 33rd/76th Foot)

Battle honours
In the list below, battle honours in capitals were awarded for participation in large operations and campaigns, while those in lowercase indicate honours granted for more specific battles. Those battle honours followed by a "+" are emblazoned on the regimental colour.

Great War

War in Afghanistan

Cadet corps
There are several Royal Canadian Army Cadets corps spread across British Columbia that are or have been affiliated to the Rocky Mountain Rangers.

Armoury

The Rocky Mountain Rangers Museum and Archives

The museum collects and preserves artifacts, documents, records and material relating to
the history of The Rocky Mountain Rangers in peace and war, and its history within the context of the military history of Canada, both for Regimental personnel and the general public.

Media
 The Cowboy Cavalry: The Story of the Rocky Mountain Rangers by Gordon E. Tolton Heritage House (Aug. 24 2011) 
 Recollections of a Rocky Mountain ranger by Jack C. Moomaw, YMCA of the Rockies

Order of precedence

See also

 List of armouries in Canada
 Military history of Canada
 History of the Canadian Army
 Canadian Forces

References

External links
 
 Okanagan Military Museum, Rocky Mtn Rangers page
 About the Rocky Mountain Rangers

Rocky Mountain Rangers
Infantry regiments of Canada
Ranger regiments of Canada
Infantry regiments of Canada in World War II
Regimental museums in Canada
Kamloops
Military units and formations of British Columbia
Military units and formations established in 1908